Lord Frederick Charles Cavendish  (30 November 1836 – 6 May 1882) was an English Liberal politician and protégé of the Prime Minister, William Ewart Gladstone.  Cavendish was appointed Chief Secretary for Ireland in May 1882 but was murdered only hours after his arrival in Dublin, a victim of the politically motivated Phoenix Park Murders.

Background and education
Born at Compton Place, Eastbourne, Sussex, Cavendish was the second son of the 7th Duke of Devonshire by his wife, Lady Blanche Howard, fourth daughter of the 6th Earl of Carlisle, and the brother of the Marquess of Hartington, later 8th Duke of Devonshire, who had also been Chief Secretary for Ireland. Cavendish, after being educated at home, matriculated in 1855 at Trinity College, Cambridge, where he graduated B.A. in 1858, and then served as a cornet with the Duke of Lancaster's Own Yeomanry cavalry.

Political career

From 1859 to 1864, Cavendish was private secretary to Lord Granville. He travelled in the United States during 1859 and 1860, and in Spain in 1860. He was elected to parliament as a Liberal for the Northern Division of the West Riding of Yorkshire, 15 July 1865, and retained that office until his death. After serving as private secretary to the prime minister, William Ewart Gladstone, from July 1872 to August 1873 he became a junior Lord of the Treasury, and held office until the resignation of the ministry. He was Financial Secretary to the Treasury from April 1880 to May 1882, when soon after the resignation of William Edward Forster, Chief Secretary for Ireland, he was appointed to succeed him.

In company with the 5th Earl Spencer, the then Lord Lieutenant of Ireland, he proceeded to Dublin, and took the oath as Chief Secretary at Dublin Castle, on 6 May 1882; but on the afternoon of the same day, while walking in the Phoenix Park in company with Thomas Henry Burke, the Permanent Under-Secretary, he was attacked from behind by several men from an extreme Irish nationalist group known as the Irish National Invincibles, who, with scalpels or surgical knives, murdered Burke and Lord Frederick Cavendish. The event was known as the Phoenix Park killings. 

His remains were returned to England and buried in the churchyard of St Peter's Church, Edensor, near Chatsworth, on 11 May, where 300 members of the House of Commons and 30,000 other persons followed to the side of the grave. 

The trial of the murderers in 1883 (see James Carey) made it evident that the death of Cavendish was not premeditated, and that he was not recognised by the assassins; the plot was against Burke, and Cavendish was murdered because he happened to be in the company of Burke.

Family
Cavendish married, on 7 June 1864, Lucy Caroline Lyttelton, second daughter of the 4th Baron Lyttelton, granddaughter of Sir Stephen Glynne and niece of William Ewart Gladstone's wife Catherine. She was maid of honour to the Queen.

A statue of Cavendish can be found in the plaza behind the town hall in Barrow-in-Furness in Cumbria (formerly and historically in Lancashire), where his father invested heavily in local industries. A window in memory of Cavendish was placed in St Margaret's Church, Westminster, at the cost of the members of the House of Commons. His imposing white Carrara marble tomb can be seen in Cartmel Priory, Cumbria. Cavendish was a council member of Yorkshire College, Leeds, which after his death established the Cavendish Chair of Physics. There is also a memorial fountain to him at Bolton Abbey.

Ancestry

Notes

References

External links
 
 

1836 births
1882 deaths
Alumni of Trinity College, Cambridge
Assassinated British MPs
Assassinated English politicians
Chief Secretaries for Ireland
Deaths by stabbing in Ireland
Duke of Lancaster's Own Yeomanry officers
English murder victims
Liberal Party (UK) MPs for English constituencies
People from Eastbourne
People murdered in Ireland
UK MPs 1865–1868
UK MPs 1874–1880
UK MPs 1880–1885
Younger sons of dukes
Frederick Cavendish, Lord
1880s murders in Ireland
1882 murders in the United Kingdom